The Severn Valley Railway is a standard gauge heritage railway in Shropshire and Worcestershire, England, named after the company that originally built the railway over which it now operates. The  heritage line runs from Bridgnorth to Kidderminster, following the course of the River Severn along the Severn Valley for much of its route, and crossing the river on the historic Victoria Bridge.

Train services are hauled by a mixture of steam and heritage diesel locomotives. The railway hosts numerous special events throughout the year, including both steam and diesel galas.

History

Commercial history

Although the railway was built by the original Severn Valley Railway Company, it was operated from opening on 1 February 1862 by the West Midland Railway which was absorbed into the Great Western Railway (GWR) on 1 August 1863. As one of the many branch lines on the GWR's extensive network, it was subsequently referred to in GWR timetables as the Severn Valley Branch.

In 1878, the GWR opened a link line between Bewdley and Kidderminster. This meant trains could run direct from the Black Country to areas of Shropshire. Most Kidderminster to Bewdley trains continued through the Wyre Forest line (dismantled in the 1960s and now forming part of National Cycle Route 45) to Tenbury Wells or Woofferton.

At Buildwas Junction (now the site of the former Ironbridge Power Station near what is now Telford) Severn Valley trains connected with services from Wellington to Much Wenlock and Craven Arms.

The line was originally planned as double-track, but was built and operated as a single-track railway. Prior to preservation, the Severn Valley line was never financially successful. Freight traffic, mostly agricultural, and coal traffic from the collieries of Alveley and Highley were the principal sources of revenue. Passenger numbers began to fall after the First World War, particularly at the large intermediate stations of Stourport, Bewdley, and Bridgnorth, with measures such as the opening of halts in the 1930s to attract more local custom having only limited impact. However, the line was strategically useful in the Second World War as an alternative diversionary route around the West Midlands.

After nationalisation in 1948, passenger traffic continued to dwindle. Although the Severn Valley Branch was closed during the Beeching cuts of the 1960s, it was already scheduled for closure prior to the publication of Beeching's report, 'The Reshaping of British Railways', on 27 March 1963. British Railways had announced in January 1962 that the Severn Valley Branch was under review, and the B.T.C. published closure proposal notices on 1 October 1962 in advance of a meeting of the West Midlands Transport Users Consultative Committee, which took place at Bridgnorth Town Hall on 8 November 1962. Objections to the proposed closure were unsuccessful and the line was closed to through passenger services on 9 September 1963, and to through freight services on 30 November 1963. Following closure, the track north of Bridgnorth was dismantled. After 1963, coal traffic survived south of Alveley until 1969, while a sparse passenger service continued to link Bewdley with Kidderminster and Hartlebury, until this too ceased in January 1970. Freight traffic between the British Sugar Corporation's Foley Park factory and Kidderminster continued until 1982.

For much of its working life, the Severn Valley line was operated by the Great Western Railway and subsequently the Western Region of British Railways. Today, the Severn Valley Railway operates almost exclusively as a heritage passenger railway.

Heritage railway
The Severn Valley Railway Society was formed in July 1965 by a group of members who wished to preserve a section of the line which had closed in 1963. BR agreed to an offer of £25,000 for the  miles of the line between Bridgnorth and Alveley Colliery in February 1966 and the Society paid an initial deposit of £2,500 in February 1967. Obtaining a Light Railway Order required a limited company to be formed, with a new Severn Valley Railway Company being incorporated in May 1967. Even at that early date, the objective of the company was to "preserve, retain and restore the standard-gauge railway extending from Bridgnorth to Kidderminster via Bewdley".

The Light Railway Order was granted in May 1970, allowing regular services to begin between Bridgnorth and Hampton Loade; the balance of the £25,000 purchase price being paid to BR on 24 June 1970.

The end of coal trains from the colliery in 1969 allowed SVR to acquire a further  miles of the line from Hampton Loade to Foley Park in 1972, the purchase price of £74,000 (£ in ) being raised by the flotation of a public company initially under the chairmanship of Sir Gerald Nabarro MP (the line was partly in his former Kidderminster constituency). The share issue took place, but after SVR volunteers discovered he planned to sell the Bridgnorth railway station site for hotel and housing development and bring business friends from outside onto the board, it led to a threatened strike by the railway's volunteer staff and his proposals were thrown out at a heated AGM. Nabarro stood down as chairman in March 1973, being succeeded by Viscount Garnock, and resigned from the board of directors in May 1973. Services were extended to Bewdley in May 1974.

Following the end of freight traffic from the British Sugar factory at Foley Park in 1982, the SVR purchased the final section of the line to Kidderminster at a cost of £75,000 (£ in ). The SVR also rented the former Comberton Hill goods yard at Kidderminster from BR, on which a new station would be built. This was achieved in time for services to Kidderminster to begin on 30 July 1984.

Major developments on the SVR since 1984 have included the commissioning of a newly constructed signal box at Kidderminster in 1987, the opening of a new boiler shop at Bridgnorth in 1990, the purchase of the freehold of Kidderminster Town station in 1994, the opening of a new carriage shed at Kidderminster in 2003, the completion of the east wing and canopy of Kidderminster Station in 2006, and the opening of the Engine House Museum at Highley in 2008. 2010 marked the Severn Valley railway's 40th anniversary since opening in 1970 and the 175th anniversary of the formation of the Great Western Railway. 2015 marked the 50th anniversary since the birth of the Severn Valley Railway on 6 July 1965. Special events were staged during both years to mark these anniversaries.

Preservation

Operations
SVR trains usually operate over the whole line length calling at most stations. The "halts" (Northwood Halt and Country Park Halt) are request stops. Passengers may use these halts during daylight hours only.

In past years services included the Severn Valley Limited and Severn Valley Venturer dining car trains, and diesel-hauled Sunset Special fish-and-chip trains.   the Severn Valley Limited has been reintroduced on selected dates; the other services do not feature in the timetable.

Many special gala days are held, often with visiting engines and rolling stock from other heritage lines; these and other attractions have seen visitor numbers increase and exceed 250,000 per year.

The SVR's rail connection to the National Rail network at Kidderminster permits various track maintenance, weed killing, track measurement and occasional through charter trains to operate from various parts of the country to Bridgnorth. An example of these visitors was that of the Venice-Simplon Orient Expresss Northern Belle in 2006. Some trackwork revisions have been completed at Kidderminster to improve ingress of incoming excursions.

The railway operated two revenue-earning freight trains in May 2007 which carried 6-metre-long pipes from Kidderminster to the Severn Trent water handling plant at Trimpley. Carriage by road of such long pipes would have been difficult because of the narrow roads in the immediate area of Trimpley. In March 2021, the railway acted as a testing ground for the first of the rebuilt Class 69 mainline locomotives.

Miniature railways
The Coalyard Miniature Railway also operates passenger trips, and is based at Kidderminster Town station. The Paddock Railway is a 32mm gauge (1:19 scale) model railway which operates most Sundays at Hampton Loade railway station. Both of these railways are operated by volunteers.

Major infrastructure damage—summer 2007

On the evening of 19 June 2007, during violent thunderstorms that struck the area, the railway suffered major damage, more extensive than at any other time in its history. Between Bridgnorth Outer Home signal and Northwood Halt, numerous landslides occurred, with several sections of the line around Fisherman's Crossing and Highley being left suspended in mid-air. A portion of track by Oldbury viaduct was also washed away. The chalets below the embankment were also washed away. At Hampton Loade, the access road to the railway station – and indeed the only road to the village – was also washed away.

A dozen other heritage railways pledged to help the stricken SVR, including Mid Hants Railway, Gloucestershire Warwickshire Railway, West Somerset Railway, Avon Valley Railway, Dean Forest Railway, Great Central Railway, North Yorkshire Moors Railway and Bluebell Railway.

It was announced on 22 June 2007 that an emergency appeal would be started within days to raise funds for the repair bill. The total cost of the damage was revised upwards as a result of further damage and a massive potential slip in the Northwood Lane area following more rain and flooding in late July. The final repair bill was put at approximately £3.7million; this was funded by an initial grant from the European Regional Development Fund of £750,000, a grant from Advantage West Midlands of £500,000, £250,000 from the Heritage Lottery Fund, £1million from the SVR's insurers (£500,000 for embankments, £350,000 for structures, signalling and track, and £150,000 specifically for Borle Viaduct), a further grant of £377,000 from the ERDF, £560,000 from the public appeal and the balance from SVR reserves.

These events damaged the summer tourist trade to the railway, the towns served, and the area as a whole. A noticeable impact to Bridgnorth's tourism was also felt. A spokesman announced on 22 June that the line was expected to reopen between Bewdley and Arley by the end of July and the section between Bridgnorth and Hampton Loade to be up and running by the end of August; however it became apparent in early July 2007 that these reopenings would be delayed by as much as a month, later extended by up to three months. On 19 July, another torrential storm caused further wreckage in at least 45 separate locations as rain fell on the already saturated ground, and in at least ten of these spots damage was so serious that major engineering work was required before reconstruction could get under way. It was also said later that the crucial link between Hampton Loade and Arley, including Highley station and the new Engine House museum, would probably not open until as late as Spring 2008.

The Bridgnorth to Hampton Loade section eventually re-opened on 9 February 2008 for the school half-term. The first passenger train to Hampton Loade since 19 June 2007 departed on time at 10:30, comprising five LMS coaches hauled by 45xx Class no. 4566. The train featured the headboard carried by the first reopening train from Bridgnorth to Hampton Loade in 1970. Although other drainage work enhancements remained to be completed, the line between Kidderminster and Bridgnorth reopened fully to the public on Good Friday, 21 March 2008. The work increased to 144 the number of culverts under the line, where previously there were 44 before the 2007 floods.

Signalling

With the exception of the connection at Kidderminster to Network Rail metals (which uses a colour light signal) the whole railway is signalled using GW style lower quadrant signals, of both metal and wooden pole/arm types. (Exceptionally, the down starter at Highley has a rare concrete post). Each station (not including halts) has a signal box, with Bewdley having two boxes (North and South), due to the size of the layout there (Bewdley originally being a junction station).

All sections between Bridgnorth and Bewdley North operate using the Tyer's Electric Train Token. Both Arley and Hampton Loade signal boxes can be switched out when not required by the service, reducing wear on the mechanics and reducing the number of signalmen required to operate the line. The SVR trains new signalmen. Arley yard may be accessed with the signal box switched out due to the presence of an intermediate token instrument, which also enables a train to depart from or terminate in the yard when the box is switched out.

The Engineer's siding at Eardington is controlled by a ground frame. No intermediate token instrument is provided, with the Highley-Bridgnorth token directly unlocking the two lever frame. This means that Hampton Loade signal box must be switched out when Eardington siding has to be used, and also that a train cannot terminate or depart from there – unless the token is taken by road between Eardington and Highley or Bridgnorth signal box.

Bridgnorth also has a ground frame at the northern end of the layout allowing movements from the Hollybush siding (which also serves as the headshunt for locomotives running round their trains) into and out of the Boiler Shop. An Annett's key which unlocks the frame may be obtained by a member of staff when released by a lever in Bridgnorth box.

Between Bewdley North and Bewdley South the double track section through platforms 1 & 2 is signalled with absolute block. The single track through platform 3 is signalled with direction lever. The line furthest from the main station buildings, known as the Rock siding, is a double-ended siding.

The single line section between Bewdley South and Kidderminster is track circuited throughout and is signalled using acceptance lever. as the preserved SVR passes through the 480 yard long Bewdley Tunnel.

Most of the signal boxes on the line bear original cast iron GWR name plates, with the sole exception being at Bridgnorth which has a replica. The SVR Kidderminster's name plate was recovered from another signal box that formerly stood on the up end of the down platform at Kidderminster station (Network Rail). The lever frame from the same signal box was reused at Arley, which has an LNWR signal box, originally from Yorton after the original was demolished. The replica name plate at Bridgnorth is made of fibre glass, although it is not known if it was moulded from the original or even if the original still exists.

Stations

 
 
 
 
 
 
 
 
 
 
 
 
 

, the only station building with any form of listing.
Eardington Halt, originally just Eardington (closed in 1982, currently used for storage only, though a few volunteers have campaigned for its re-opening in recent years)
Hampton Loade
Country Park Halt (request stop) replaced Alveley Halt
Alveley Halt (never re-opened by SVR after BR closure, due to it serving a now closed mine, and the opening of the new Country Park Halt)

 (request stop)
 Passing the West Midland Safari Park

With the exception of the two request halts (Country Park and Northwood), all intermediate stations have the ability to pass trains on the single line. However, Highley's passing loop lacks a platform and facing point locks on points to attached sidings, a legal requirement for passenger-carrying line, meaning trains carrying fare-paying passengers may not pass using this loop. It is used for works trains, demonstration goods trains and empty stock workings.
A short section of multiple track exists between Bewdley South and Bewdley North signal boxes.

Kidderminster Town station is not an original station. It was created by the SVR, based upon the original GWR station at Ross-on-Wye (1892). Various projects have been carried out by volunteers and contractors to add to the general GWR ambience. Major projects include the porte cochère to the front of the station, the ornamental crestings on the two towers and the canopy over the concourse which was completed in 2006, along with the final, east, wing of the station.

Plans for a significant redevelopment of Bridgnorth station were approved by Shropshire Council in August 2016.

Former stations
Former stations, most of which were closed with the Severn Valley line as a whole in 1963, after 101 years in use:

Between Hartlebury and Bewdley:

Stourport (1862–1970)
Burlish Halt, towards the north of Stourport at Burlish Crossing (1930–1970)

Between Kidderminster and Bewdley:

Foley Park Halt (1905–1970)
Rifle Range Halt (1905–1920)

North of Bridgnorth:

Linley Halt (1862–1963)
Coalport West (1862–1963)
Jackfield Halt (1934–1954) & (1954–1963) Relocated due to land instability.
Ironbridge and Broseley (1862–1963)
Buildwas Junction (1862–1963)
Cressage (1862–1963)
Cound Halt (1934–1963)
Berrington (1862–1963)

Extensions to the railway

Northwards
Extending the preserved railway north from Bridgnorth was mooted by groups within the SVR as early as the mid-1970s, but the first plan was dismissed as impossible by the then Board of the SVR. For many years the SVR official website confirmed that 'the railway land north of Bridgnorth has been long since sold, and there is now no possibility of Severn Valley trains reaching Ironbridge and Shrewsbury ever again'. In 2002 the Board reported that third party enquiries into the possibility of EU funding to restore rail communication between Bridgnorth and Ironbridge had resulted in press reports that the SVR wished to extend to Ironbridge; the Board agreed that it would monitor developments and would welcome seeing the results of any feasibility study.

In January 2019, Campaign for Better Transport released a report identifying the line between Shrewsbury and Ironbridge which was listed as Priority 2 for reopening. Priority 2 is for those lines which require further development or a change in circumstances (such as housing developments).

In March 2021 an independent group, the Ironbridge Railway Trust (IRT), announced that they had made a bid to the government's 'Restoring Your Railway Ideas Fund' (RYR) to examine re-opening the line between Buildwas and Bridgnorth as a public railway, following the original route of the original Severn Valley branch wherever possible. The IRT application named both the Severn Valley Railway and Telford Steam Railway among the stakeholders, noting that the SVR had expressed an interest in understanding the outputs of the proposed RYR study although no discussions on operational engagement had been held, while the TSR had expressed caution about IRT's concept and proposed a Power Station-Ironbridge tram scheme, but was willing to work together going forward. The bid was considered in the third Ideas Fund round but was not one of the successful bids.

Westwards
The former Tenbury Line trackbed is substantially intact as far as Newnham Bridge station before it is hemmed in by modern development. However, several underbridges are missing, including the substantial Dowles Viaduct over the river Severn, a span over the Bewdley to Bridgnorth road and a brick span at Cleobury. Added to this are the same problems relating to land ownership, realignments of roads at former bridge sites and probable lack of custom at the Newnham Bridge end.

Eastwards
No extension eastwards towards Wolverhampton was ever built, although several schemes were proposed. These included:
An Act of Parliament for construction of the Bridgnorth, Wolverhampton and Staffordshire Railway which received Royal Assent in June 1866. Money could not be raised and the powers lapsed. 
The Wolverhampton and Bridgnorth Light Railway which was to be built under the terms of the Light Railways Act 1896. The route, which was planned by civil engineer WB Myers-Beswick, would have run from junctions with the GWR and LNWR at Priestfield to join the SVR south of Bridgnorth with a separate station in Bridgnorth Low Town. Further details show the line of the proposed railway bordered the lane between Sutton Mill and Sutton Farm, Dog Kennel and land owned by a Henry Cavendish Cavendish and Bridgnorth Rural District Council.
The GWR Act of 11 July 1905 which granted powers for construction of a line from near Oxley viaduct via Wombourne to join the Severn Valley Line at two junctions 1 mile and 1½ miles south of Bridgnorth. These powers were again granted in the GWR (Additional Powers) Act of 1924 but although the Wombourne branch was completed in 1925, the connection to Bridgnorth was abandoned. There is thought to be some evidence of such a spur from the Severn Valley Line immediately south of Crossing Cottage near Eardington.

Southwards
The SVR owns the trackbed of the former Bewdley to Hartlebury section through Mount Pleasant Tunnel to a point 302 yards beyond its southern portal, approximately mid-way to the former location of Burlish Crossing. In late 2015 the Railway announced that Rail Safety Solutions had taken a lease on the portion as far as Mount Pleasant Tunnel, which they will use to provide training to Network Rail apprentices.

Between Burlish and Stourport station, the alignment of the former Bewdley to Hartlebury section has been redeveloped for housing. However, from the Hartlebury direction the trackbed is intact as a bridleway from Mitton (the eastern throat of the original station), with only a span over the A449 Worcester to Kidderminster main road missing. The abutments are intact. Almost all of the trackbed is in Council ownership and in 2007 they expressed an interest in reopening as a commuter line.

Rolling stock

The railway can call on a large fleet to operate its services. Only a small 'core' group of vehicles actually belong to the railway company itself; the remainder are owned by an associated groups, such as the Great Western (Severn Valley Railway) Association, or individuals. The SVR is also the base of the West Midland Group, which focuses on DMU preservation. Locomotives and vehicles from the railway are now only infrequently used on excursions on the National Rail network, but in the past have operated across Great Britain.

Maintenance facilities

Locomotive works
The main locomotive works are located at Bridgnorth. For health and safety reasons it is not normally open to the public, but guided tours and open days are arranged from time to time. 
The works facilities include lifting jacks, a Noble and Lund wheel lathe, a wheel drop recovered from Leicester MPD, and a boiler shop with overhead crane. Works to improve natural illumination, waterproof the shed more effectively, and fit the southern end with roller-shutter doors were completed in early 2009, and a further upgrade completed in 2022 included the installation of an overhead crane, replacement of the roof, and a number of environmental initiatives such as conversion to LED lighting.

Traction maintenance depot
Diesel locomotives are maintained at the traction maintenance depot at Kidderminster. A three-road diesel depot building was opened in 2016, with facilities including a pit and an overhead crane.

Carriage works
Although carriage repair and restoration is carried out at a number of locations on the railway, the main carriage repair works is located in the former goods shed at Kidderminster which lies adjacent to the main Birmingham to Worcester line. As well as having a machine shop and fabrication equipment to carry out a full range of body and bogie repairs, the carriage works is also able to calibrate and adjust dynamo voltage regulators and to thoroughly overhaul and test vacuum brake equipment. As with the locomotive works, for health and safety reasons it is not normally open to the public.

The Engine House

The Engine House, built on land adjacent to Highley station, provides covered accommodation for locomotives currently out of service, as well as space for displays of other rolling stock and an education/interpretation centre.

Construction and opening 
The land on which the Engine House stands was originally the sidings for Highley Colliery and was later used as the "Landsale Yard" for Alveley Colliery. The SVR had planned to use the area for a facility to store and display locomotives that didn't hold current operational certificates as early as 1973. After the opportunity arose to obtain matching Heritage Lottery funding alongside grants from the European Regional Development Fund and Advantage West Midlands, the land was acquired by the SVR in August 2001. Planning permission for development was granted in 2004.

The planned opening in mid-2007 was delayed by the flood damage at Highley in June of that year (see ). It eventually opened to the public on 20 March 2008, on the same day that full line services resumed between Bridgnorth and Kidderminster. An official opening was held on 28 April 2009, attended by the Lord Lieutenant of Shropshire, Algernon Heber-Percy. A second dedication, along with that of the newly constructed footbridge at Highley station, was performed on 21 October 2009 by Prince Richard, Duke of Gloucester, who had been unable to attend the first ceremony due to illness.

In television and film
The 1976 BBC television adaptation of Charles Dickens' short story The Signalman was filmed around the cutting on the Kidderminster side of the Bewdley Tunnel. A replica signal box was constructed in the cutting, while interior scenes were filmed in the actual signal box at Highley.
Portions of The Seven-Per-Cent Solution (1976) were filmed on the railway.
Scenes between Bewdley and Hampton Loade stations were filmed for the Walt Disney Productions film Candleshoe (screened 1977), starring David Niven and Jodie Foster, were shot in 1976. GWR No. 4566 was featured in the movie.
The 1977 television film version of Silver Blaze used the railway.
The 1978 film version of The Thirty Nine Steps was partly filmed on the railway—specifically, the scenes where Hannay (Robert Powell) hangs from Victoria Bridge. The scene is supposed to be set in Scotland.
The BBC TV children's series God's Wonderful Railway (1980) was filmed on the SVR.
Another BBC children's series The Box of Delights (1984) was filmed along the line; station scenes featured both Bewdley and Arley.
In the 2005 film, The Chronicles of Narnia: The Lion, the Witch and the Wardrobe GWR Manor no. 7802 Bradley Manor appeared with the train that brought the Pevensies to the nearest station to the Professor's house.
Victoria Bridge appears briefly in the 2011 film Sherlock Holmes: A Game of Shadows when Holmes pushes Dr Watson's wife, Mary, off a train as it goes over a bridge.
Bewdley and Kidderminster, locomotive 42968, and the rake of LNER coaches featured in sequences of Dancing on the Edge, a five-part dramatisation by Stephen Poliakoff, filmed in February 2012 and aired in February 2013.

References

Bibliography

External links

Severn Valley Railway official site
Severn Valley Railway Charitable Trust
SVR Volunteer Office
SVR Wiki (independent to Wikipedia)
Handbook to the Severn Valley Railway (1863)

 
1862 establishments in the United Kingdom
European Route of Industrial Heritage Anchor Points
Heritage railways in Shropshire
Heritage railways in Worcestershire
Ironbridge Gorge
Kidderminster
Bridgnorth
River Severn
Great Western Railway constituents